Stanislav Nikolayevich Sorokin (17 February 1941 – 2 February 1991) was a Russian amateur boxer. He represented the Soviet Union at the 1964 Summer Olympics held in Tokyo, Japan, winning a bronze medal in the flyweight division.

References
Sports-reference

1941 births
1991 deaths
Soviet male boxers
Olympic boxers of the Soviet Union
Olympic bronze medalists for the Soviet Union
Boxers at the 1964 Summer Olympics
Martial artists from Moscow
Olympic medalists in boxing
Russian male boxers
Medalists at the 1964 Summer Olympics
Flyweight boxers